is a district of Minato, Tokyo, Japan.

Education
Minato City Board of Education operates public elementary and junior high schools.

Kita-Aoyama 1-2-chōme and 3-chōme 1-4-ban are zoned to Aoyama Elementary School (青山小学校). 3-chōme 5-15-ban are zoned to Seinan Elementary School (青南小学校). All of Kita Aoyama is zoned to Aoyama Junior High School (青山中学校)

References

Districts of Minato, Tokyo